Andre Agassi was the defending champion but lost in the third round to Johan Kriek.

Brad Gilbert won in the final 6–2, 6–2 when Kriek was forced to retire.

Seeds
All sixteen seeds received a bye to the second round.

  Andre Agassi (third round)
  Jimmy Connors (quarterfinals)
  Tim Mayotte (third round)
  Aaron Krickstein (second round)
  Mikael Pernfors (third round)
  Brad Gilbert (champion)
  Kevin Curren (semifinals)
  Andrés Gómez (second round)
  Amos Mansdorf (third round)
  Dan Goldie (second round)
  Michael Chang (semifinals)
  Christo van Rensburg (second round)
  Robert Seguso (second round)
  Paul Annacone (second round)
  Derrick Rostagno (second round)
  Johan Kriek (final)

Draw

Finals

Top half

Section 1

Section 2

Bottom half

Section 3

Section 4

References
 1989 Volvo U.S. National Indoor Draw

1989 Singles
1989 Grand Prix (tennis)